Pseudosirenites is a genus of Upper Triassic ammonites belonging to the ceratitid family Trachyceratidae, like Sirenites, but with a narrow outer rim (venter) that has a nodose keel on either side.

References 

 Arkell, et al., Mesozoic Ammonoidea, ' Treatise on Invertebrate Paleontology, Part L, Mollusca 4, Geological Society of America. 1957.

Trachyceratidae
Triassic ammonites
Ceratitida genera
Ammonites of North America